The Pacific PR02 was a Formula One car for the 1995 season. The number 17 car was driven by Andrea Montermini, and the number 16 car was driven by team shareholder Bertrand Gachot, and later pay drivers Giovanni Lavaggi and Jean-Denis Délétraz, before Gachot returned. The team's test driver was Oliver Gavin. The engine was a Ford EDC 3.0 V8. The team did not have a main sponsor. The car was designed by Frank Coppuck.

While the car's performance was an improvement over its predecessor, the PR02 suffered from poor reliability, finishing seven times in thirty-four starts. Out of these seven times, it finished last on two occasions and was not classified on another two occasions.

The team finished last in the Constructors' Championship, with no points, and withdrew from Formula One at the end of 1995.

Complete Formula One results
(key)

References

External links

1995 Formula One season cars
Pacific Formula One cars